The first season  of Degrassi: The Next Generation, a Canadian serial teen drama television series, commenced airing in Canada on 14 October 2001 and concluded on 3 March 2002, consisting of fifteen episodes. The series introduces a group of seventh and eighth grade school children, and follows their lives as they deal with some of the challenges and issues teenagers face such as online predators, body image, dysfunctional families, sex, puberty, rumours, peer pressure, stress, and drug use.

The first season was broadcast on the Canadian terrestrial television network CTV, on Sundays at 7:00 p.m. It debuted with a one-hour movie of the week special, "Mother and Child Reunion", which form the first two episodes of season one. In the United States, it was broadcast on the Noggin cable channel during its programming block for teenagers, The N. The season was released domestically on DVD as a three disc boxed set on 19 October 2004 by Alliance Atlantis Home Entertainment, although it was released to the US market almost a month earlier, on 28 September 2004. The season is also available on iTunes.

The reception for Degrassi: The Next Generation'''s first season was mixed. It had earned itself 365,000 Canadian viewers aged 18 to 49, while its accompanying website was attracting 28 million hits per month, but press reviews were not as complimentary. The season picked up nominations at the Directors Guild of Canada Awards, the Gemini Awards and the Young Artist Awards.

Cast
For the new generation of students, the producers kept the same model that had been used during the casting of the previous series, Degrassi Junior High and Degrassi High and chose 11 children out of 600 auditionees, hoping to provide a group of characters the target audience of kids and teenagers could relate to, rather than the typical gorgeous actors in their twenties pretending to be teenagers, something that some of the other shows of the same period, such as Buffy the Vampire Slayer and Dawson's Creek which were targeting the same audience, were and still are continually doing to this day. Providing ties to the previous series in the Degrassi universe, Stefan Brogren, Dan Woods, and Amanda Stepto were hired to reprise their original roles, being featured throughout the season while the first episode served as a reunion for many of the previous cast members of the franchise.

Main cast
 Miriam McDonald as Emma Nelson (15 episodes)
 Aubrey Graham as James "Jimmy" Brooks (10 episodes)
 Christina Schmidt as Terri McGreggor (13 episodes)
 Melissa McIntyre as Ashley Kerwin (13 episodes)
 Sarah Barrable-Tishauer as Liberty Van Zandt (12 episodes) 
 Cassie Steele as Manuela "Manny" Santos (15 episodes)
 Stefan Brogren as Archie "Snake" Simpson (12 episodes)
 Jake Goldsbie as Tobias "Toby" Issacs (15 episodes)
 Shane Kippel as Gavin "Spinner" Mason (12 episodes)
 Ryan Cooley as James Tiberius "J.T." Yorke (15 episodes)
 Lauren Collins as Paige Michalchuk (13 episodes)
 Daniel Clark as Sean Cameron (11 episodes)
 Dan Woods as Mr. Daniel Raditch (11 episodes)

Recurring cast
 Linlyn Lue as Ms. Laura Kwan (10 episodes)
 Amanda Stepto as Christine "Spike" Nelson (6 episodes)
 Maria Ricossa as Kate Kerwin (6 episodes)
 Nigel Hamer as Jeff Isaacs (6 episodes)
 Michael Kinney as Coach Darryl Armstrong (5 episodes)
 Andrea Lewis as Hazel Aden (4 episodes)
 Kris Holden-Ried as Scott "Tracker" Cameron (3 episodes)
 Fielding Horan as Oskar (3 episodes)
 Anais Granofsky as Lucy Fernandez (2 episodes)
 Don McKellar as Keith Barra (2 episodes)
 Stacie Mistysyn as Caitlin Ryan (2 episodes)
 Pat Mastroianni as Joey Jeremiah (2 episodes)
 Maria Vacratsis as Sheila (2 episodes)

Guest stars
 Danah-Jean Brown as Trish Skye
 Darrin Brown as Dwayne Myers
 Michael Carry as Simon Dexter
 Irene Courakos as Alexa Pappadopoulos Dexter
 Chrissa Erodotou as Diana Economopoulos
 Rebecca Haines as Kathleen Mead
 Sara Holmes as Alison Hunter
 Neil Hope as Derek "Wheels" Wheeler
 Kyra Levy as Maya Goldberg
 Cathy Keenan as Liz O'Rourke
 Siluck Saysanasy as Yick Yu
 Alexa Steele as Angela Jeremiah
 Jeff Gruich as Mr. Nystrom/Jordan
 Ho "Oyster" Chow as Policeman
 Geoffrey Bowes as Todd McGreggor
 Christina Collins as Anne Marie Issacs
 Kyle Schmid as NAK Reporter Kyle
 Sabrina Sanchez as NAK Reporter Nicole
 Christian Potenza as Cashier
 Adrian Roberto as Guy
 Sue Johanson as Dr. Sally
 Jordan Chan as Lily
 Andrew Gillies as Robert Kerwin
 Laura Jordan as Soap Opera Woman
 Brent Holmes McGill as Soap Opera Man
 Bruce Vavrina as Rude Man
 Christopher Armstrong as Food Delivery Man
 Rick Sood as Hungry Student 1
 Edde Chau as Hungry Student 2
 Jonathan Pal as Hungry Student 3
 David Dunbar as Nurse Henderson

Crew
The season was produced by Epitome Pictures and CTV. The executive producers are Epitome Pictures' CEO and Degrassi: The Next Generation co-creator Linda Schuyler, and her husband, Epitome president Stephen Stohn. Degrassi: The Next Generation co-creator Yan Moore served as the creative consultant and David Lowe was the line producer. Aaron Martin was hired as the story editor and was promoted to senior story editor mid-season. James Hurst then became the story editor. The season's writers are Tassie Cameron, Myra Fried, James Hurst, Aaron Martin, Yan Moore, and Susin Nielsen. The directors throughout the season are James Allodi, Anthony Browne, Paul Fox, Laurie Lynd, Bruce McDonald, Eleanor Lindo, and Stefan Scaini.

ReceptionDegrassi: The Next Generation received mixed reviews about its first season. Based on the pilot episode, Stephanie McGrath of Canoe.ca's AllPop acknowledged Miriam McDonald's portrayal of Emma Nelson as "stellar acting abilities in a super creepy storyline ... high on tension, low on cheese [and] top-notch". She criticized the reunion sub-plot, though, saying it was marred by "wooden, stilted and over-rehearsed acting; the young actors actually showed up their classic Degrassi counter-parts in the pilot episode. Their acting was solid, believable and age-appropriate [in a story-line which] demonstrates that the creative forces behind The Next Generation haven't lost touch with teens yet ... One installment of Degrassi: The Next Generation is worth 20 episodes of Dawson's Creek". Towards the end of the season, the Canadian issue of TV Guide summed up the run as "Not just Canadian TV - It's great Canadian TV! Degrassi offers a gritty look into the lives of real teens complete with acne and bad dye jobs. It has something for everyone because we've all been there."

Other critics were less enthusiastic about the season, though. The Seattle Times' Melanie McFarland was unsure whether the series' success in Canada would follow when it began airing in the US. "As popular as 'Degrassi' was, it was still a mere cult hit in the United States; the crowd that had access to it initially on PBS might not be able to tune into [The N]. Soft-pedaling through the issues might work for today's family of viewers, but what's gentle enough for Mom and Dad's peace of mind might not be enough to hook Junior or the original Degrassi's older fans". She was, however, "happy [The N] chose Degrassi students to navigate teen perils instead of digging up Screech and the gang for another nauseating go-round". Tony Atherton of the Ottawa Citizen had mixed feelings of the new incarnation, saying it "has a cleaner, more polished look, has lost its edge [and offers] nothing new to viewers familiar with the groundbreaking preceding series, nor to anyone else who has watched the deluge of teen dramas since", adding that because there is "little ground left to break in teen drama there is a sense of déjà vu with regards to the plots and characters". He did, however, praise the show for having "the same simple narrative told from a kid's viewpoint, and the same regard for unvarnished reality [as Degrassi Junior High and Degrassi High, making it] light years from far-fetched high-school melodramas like Boston Public and Dawson's Creek [and for that] is every bit as good as its beloved predecessor. In fact, in some respects it is even better". After watching nearly seventy hours of twenty-one Canadian-produced programs, the Simon Fraser University cited Degrassi: The Next Generation'' in their report as one of the Canadian television programmes that is "too Caucasian".

Despite the mixed reviews and controversy over the storylines, the first season was still watched by 365,000 18- to 49-year-old Canadians, making it Canada's top-rated domestic drama at the time, while its accompanying website was attracting 28 million hits per month.

The pilot was nominated for two Directors Guild of Canada Awards, winning in the "Outstanding Achievement in a Television Series - Children's" category, and picked up Gemini Award nominations in the categories for "Best Photography in a Dramatic Program or Series" and "Best Short Dramatic Program". Actors Jake Goldsbie and Ryan Cooley were nominated for their portrayals of Toby Isaacs and J.T. Yorke respectively at the Young Artist Awards. Five episodes were given a total of six awards by The National Council on Family Relations at its 34th Annual Awards ceremony.

Episodes
In the United States, the third episode "Family Politics" was aired on Noggin's "The N" block as the series premiere; "Mother and Child Reunion" was held back and aired as the season finale. This caused continuity problems for viewers as the episode depicted Toby being introduced to Manny and Emma for the first time, and was set before the school year began. The final episode of the season, "Jagged Little Pill", was also held back while The N decided whether its subject about ecstasy abuse was too controversial. When an edited version was made available, The N aired it as part of season two. In reruns however, the episodes have aired in the original order intended by the show's producers. Most of the episodes are named after songs and films from the 1950s, 70s, 80s and 90s. 

This list is by order of production, as they appear on the DVD.

DVD release
The DVD release of season one was released by FUNimation Entertainment in the U.S. on 28 September 2004, and by Alliance Atlantis Home Entertainment in Canada on 19 October 2004 after it had completed broadcast on television. As well as every episode from the season, the DVD release features bonus material including deleted scenes, bloopers and behind-the-scenes featurettes.

The DVD was first released in Australia on May 3, 2007 by Roadshow Entertainment, without any bonus features. On September 8, 2010, the DVD was re-released along with season two by Shock Entertainment with all of the bonus features intact. Season one is currently being released by Umbrella Entertainment.

References

Notes

External links
Season 1 episode synopses at CTV Television Network
 

Degrassi: The Next Generation seasons
2001 Canadian television seasons
2002 Canadian television seasons